Carlos Isaac Muñoz Obejero (born 30 April 1998), known as Carlos Isaac, is a Spanish footballer who plays as a right back for Albacete Balompié.

Club career
Born in Navalmoral de la Mata, Cáceres, Extremadura, Carlos Isaac joined Atlético Madrid's youth setup in 2015 at the age of 17, from CD Diocesano. He made his senior debut with the reserves on 10 September 2017, starting in a 1–1 Segunda División B home draw against Celta de Vigo B.

On 9 March 2018, Carlos Isaac renewed his contract until 2020. His La Liga debut came the following 1 April, as he started in a 1–0 home win against Deportivo de La Coruña.

On 29 August 2020, free agent Carlos Isaac agreed to a three-year deal with Deportivo Alavés, being immediately loaned to Segunda División side Albacete Balompié for the season. Roughly one year later, he moved to fellow second division side Real Oviedo also in a temporary deal.

On 4 August 2022, Carlos Isaac signed a three-year contract with F.C. Vizela of the Portuguese Primeira Liga. The following 17 January, however, he returned to Alba and signed a permanent two-and-a-half-year contract with the club.

Career statistics

Club

References

External links

1998 births
Living people
Sportspeople from the Province of Cáceres
Footballers from Extremadura
Spanish footballers
Association football defenders
La Liga players
Segunda División players
Segunda División B players
Atlético Madrid B players
Atlético Madrid footballers
Deportivo Alavés players
Albacete Balompié players
Real Oviedo players
F.C. Vizela players
Spain youth international footballers
Spanish expatriate footballers
Spanish expatriate sportspeople in Portugal
Expatriate footballers in Portugal